Josef Němec (25 September 1933 – 10 September 2013) was a boxer from Czechoslovakia.

Born in České Budějovice, Czechoslovakia, he competed in the 1956 Summer Olympics held in Melbourne, Australia, going out in the quarter finals of the heavyweight event. He returned to the 1960 Summer Olympics held in Rome, Italy, again as a heavyweight boxer where he went one better, going out in the semi final to finish in third place. In Moscow 1963 he became European champion.

References

External links 
 Sports-reference

1933 births
2013 deaths
Heavyweight boxers
Czechoslovak male boxers
Olympic boxers of Czechoslovakia
Olympic bronze medalists for Czechoslovakia
Boxers at the 1956 Summer Olympics
Boxers at the 1960 Summer Olympics
Boxers at the 1964 Summer Olympics
Sportspeople from České Budějovice
Olympic medalists in boxing
Medalists at the 1960 Summer Olympics
Czech male boxers